Ezequiel Alberto Palacios (born 2 October 1992) is an Argentine professional volleyball player. He is a member of the Argentina national team and a bronze medallist at the Olympic Games Tokyo 2020. At the professional club level, he plays for Montpellier Volley.

Honours

Clubs
 National championships
 2017/2018  Argentine Cup, with Ciudad Vóley
 2021/2022  French Championship, with Montpellier Volley

Individual awards
 2018: Pan American Cup – Most Valuable Player
 2018: Pan American Cup – Best Outside Hitter

References

External links

 
 Player profile at LegaVolley.it 
 Player profile at PlusLiga.pl 
 Player profile at Volleybox.net
 
 

1992 births
Living people
People from San Martín, Buenos Aires
Sportspeople from Buenos Aires Province
Argentine men's volleyball players
Olympic volleyball players of Argentina
Olympic medalists in volleyball
Olympic bronze medalists for Argentina
Volleyball players at the 2016 Summer Olympics
Volleyball players at the 2020 Summer Olympics
Medalists at the 2020 Summer Olympics
Volleyball players at the 2010 Summer Youth Olympics
Pan American Games medalists in volleyball
Pan American Games gold medalists for Argentina
Volleyball players at the 2015 Pan American Games
Medalists at the 2015 Pan American Games
Argentine expatriate sportspeople in Poland
Expatriate volleyball players in Poland
Argentine expatriate sportspeople in Italy
Expatriate volleyball players in Italy
Argentine expatriate sportspeople in France
Expatriate volleyball players in France
AZS Olsztyn players
Outside hitters